There were two subtropical storms (then-called neutercanes) known as Bravo, which is second in the phonetic alphabet:

Hurricane Betty, in the 1972 Atlantic hurricane season 
Hurricane Fran, in the 1973 Atlantic hurricane season